The Mauritius Tourism Promotion Authority (MTPA) is a statutory board under the Ministry of Tourism and Leisure of Mauritius established in 1996 by the MTPA Act. The task of the MTPA is to promote the country's tourism industry, provide information to tourists on facilities, infrastructures and services, to initiate action to promote cooperation with other tourism agencies, to conduct research into market trends and market opportunities and disseminate such information and other relevant statistical data on Mauritius.

Offices
The MTPA overseas offices in the following countries;

 – Paris
 – Randburg
 – Milan
 – Munich 
 – Beijing
 – Zurich
 – New Delhi
 – Reunion
 – Belgium
 – Luxembourg
 – Saudi Arabia

See also
 Tourism in Mauritius
 Ministry of Tourism and Leisure

References

External links
Mauritius Tourism Promotion Authority
www.gov.mu/portal/site/tourist/ Government of Mauritius Tourism Portal

Tourism in Mauritius
Government agencies of Mauritius
1996 establishments in Mauritius
Government agencies established in 1996
Tourism agencies